Lidiane Jones is an American business executive and the CEO of Slack, succeeding Stewart Butterfield. She was formerly executive vice president and general manager at the parent company Salesforce, for Experience Cloud, Commerce Cloud and Marketing Cloud.

References 

Salesforce
Women corporate executives
American women chief executives
Brazilian women
Living people

Year of birth missing (living people)